Estadio Jose Rigoberto Aleman is an association football stadium in Salamá, Olancho, Honduras.

Jose Rigoberto Aleman, Estadio